Raul António Leandro de Figueiredo (born 10 March 1927) former Portuguese footballer who played as a defender.

External links 
 
 

1927 births
Portuguese footballers
Association football defenders
Primeira Liga players
C.F. Os Belenenses players
Portugal international footballers
Living people
Place of birth missing (living people)